A dansa, also spelt dança, was an Old Occitan form of lyric poetry developed in the late thirteenth century among the troubadours. It is related to the English term "dance" and was often accompanied by dancing. A closely related form, the balada or balaresc, had a more complex structure, and is related to the ballade but unrelated to the ballad. Both terms derive from Occitan words for "to dance": dansar and balar/ballar.

A dansa begins with a respos of one or two lines, whose rhyme scheme matches that of the first line or two of each subsequent stanza. The actual respos may have been repeated between stanzas, of which there were usually three, as a refrain. The few surviving melodies of dansas seem like incipient virelais. The verses of the dansa were sung by a soloist while the refrain was sung by a choir. A dansa lacking a vuelta is called a danseta.

In a balada each stanza is divided into three parts. The first part and second part are identical, each ending with the same rhyme as the first line of the poem. The third part of the stanza is identical to the refrain (refranh) in form. The refrain, which begins the song, is repeated after each stanza. In a balada the lines of the choir and the soloist could mix.

A desdansa (or desdança) was the opposite of a dansa, not in form but in content. Whereas a dansa had joyful lyrics and lively music, a desdansa was sad and lamenting, much like a planh designed for dance. The desdansa is defined, and exemplified, in the Cançoneret de Ripoll.

List of dansas and baladas

Notes

References

Aubrey, Elizabeth (1996). The Music of the Troubadours. Indianapolis: Indiana University Press. . 
Riquer, Martí de (1964). Història de la Literatura Catalana, vol. 1. Barcelona: Edicions Ariel. 

Western medieval lyric forms
Occitan literary genres